Amman Kovil Thiruvizha is a 1990 Indian Tamil-language film directed by Murugan Kalainjanam. The film stars Nizhalgal Ravi and Kanaka .

Cast 

Nizhalgal Ravi
Kanaka
Goundamani
Senthil
Kovai Sarala

Soundtrack

The film score and the soundtrack were composed by Ilaiyaraaja.

References

1990 films
Films scored by Ilaiyaraaja
1990s Tamil-language films